= Mast Forest Late Archaic Period =

This period in North American archaeology is also referred to as the Piedmont period. The area that this tradition covered went from New England to North Carolina.

The projectile points that are found in this tradition separate it form the Lake Forest tradition. Many of the tools that are found in this area are also lean more towards that of pestles and grinders. This indicates that the people were more interested in using the nuts and acorns that were located in this area. Although they did hunt and fish, most of their attention focused on using plants and nuts.

== Sources ==
Fagan, Brian M. Ancient North America 2005. Thames and Hudson.
